Dan Beutler (born 10 October 1977) is a Swedish handballer, who has previously played for German side clubs SG Flensburg-Handewitt and HSV Hamburg. Lately he played for TBV Lemgo.

References

1977 births
Living people
Swedish male handball players
IFK Kristianstad players
Redbergslids IK players
21st-century Swedish people